Hockey in Scotland may refer to:

Field hockey
 Scottish Hockey Union
 Scottish Hockey National Leagues
 Scotland men's national field hockey team
 Scotland women's national field hockey team

Ice hockey
 Ice hockey in Scotland
 Scottish Ice Hockey